HMS Challenger   (pennant number K07) was a Royal Navy diving support vessel, operational from 1984 to 1990.

Challenger had a saturation diving system allowing 12 divers to live in relative comfort in a large diving chamber amidships.

History
In 1979 a paper describing the design for Challenger was presented at an Institute of Marine Engineering conference.

HMS Challenger was a unique vessel in Royal Navy service, purpose built to support deep sea operations and saturation diving.  Built by Scotts at Greenock, the ship was launched on 19 May 1981, but not commissioned until 1984, during a time when the Royal Navy was cutting back on expenditure. The consequence was that the £80m Challenger was seen as an extravagance that the Ministry of Defence could not afford.  After only a few years service, in 1990 the ship was laid up and offered for sale.  The total cost for the construction of the ship was also increased by various errors and delays during construction.

In 1993 the ship was purchased by a company, Subsea Offshore, to be converted for work decontaminating hazardous waste dumped in the Baltic Sea and North Atlantic.  By 1996 the ship was still laid up and may never have been used by Subsea.

In following years the navy used other DP diving vessels for its diving work including the  hired from Seaforth Maritime, which had been used while Challenger was being built.

The vessel was later bought by the Namibian Minerals Corporation (NAMCO), and fitted with equipment to recover diamonds from the sea floor. The ship was converted at the Nauta Shipyard in Gdynia, Poland, and made its first diamond recoveries in December 2000. The ship was bought by De Beers in April 2003 when it offered US$20 million for several assets, among them Challenger.

See also

References

Auxiliary ships of the Royal Navy
Ships built on the River Clyde
1981 ships
Armed forces diving
Submarine rescue ships
Marine salvage
Underwater mining